Ngayon at Kailanman (International title: Now and Forever) is a 2018 Philippine drama television series starring Joshua Garcia and Julia Barretto. The series aired on ABS-CBN's Primetime Bida evening block and worldwide via The Filipino Channel from August 20, 2018, to January 18, 2019, replacing Bagani and was replaced by The General's Daughter.

Premise
Beneath the wealth and name of the Cortes Clan, one of the country's richest families lies a deep dark secret, and nothing will stand in the way of Eva, a girl on the verge of womanhood, to get to the truth and reclaim her rightful place as heiress to the family's fortune and that of the Nostalgia—a necklace of immense beauty and value, witness to the family's history and has been one of their most important possessions for almost a century. However, even the best quests for justice can unravel in the wake of a love story that reaches far beyond this life — with the Cortes matriarch Stella's sons Inno and Oliver. As Eva fight the people running after the Cortes wealth and name, and as the Nostalgia find its proper place upon her neck, she discovers what is truly important in life — family, forgiveness, redemption and Love.

Cast and characters

Main cast
 Joshua Garcia as Innocencio "Inno" S. Cortes
 Julia Barretto as Eva Mapendo / Angela M. Cortes

Supporting cast
 Iza Calzado as Rebecca Marquez-Young
 Alice Dixson as Stella Simbajon-Cortes
 Ina Raymundo as Adessa Mapendo 
 Dominic Ochoa as Abel Dimaguiba
 Christian Vasquez as Hernan A. Cortes
 Jameson Blake as Oliver "Oli" S. Cortes
 Joao Constancia as Dominic "Dom" Consuelo
 Rio Locsin as Rosa Mapendo 
 Rosemarie Gil as Doña Carmen Alipio-Cortes
 Elisse Joson as Roxanne / Christina M. Constantino

Recurring cast
 Leo Rialp as Mayor Nanding Simbajon
 Maria Isabel Lopez as Lucia Simbajon
 Rey Abellana as Atty. Alfred Cortes
 
 Ana Capri as Ising Bernabe
 Erika Padilla as Mariel Saavedra
 Claire Ruiz as Cathy Bermudez
 Cai Cortez as Mela
 Pen Medina as Lodi
 Jason Gainza as Macoy
 Kristel Fulgar as Queenie
 Igi Boy Flores as Owa
 BJ Forbes as Buboy
 Yayo Aguila as Sonia
 Ruby Ruiz as Miding

Extended cast
 William Lorenzo as Larry
 Jef Gaitan as Janix
 Joe Vargas as Kiko
 Mark Neumann as Jin
Kokoy de Santos as Carl
 MJ Cayabyab as Isda
 Drake Ventenilla as Popo
 Bradley Holmes as Bryan
 Dwight Gaston as Botong
 Gerard Acao as Mokmok
 Via Antonio as Mimay
 Mark Oblea as Dario
 Gem Ramos as Elaine
 TJ Valderrama as Ferdie
 Richard Manabat as Ricky
 Ethyl Osorio as Jennifer
 Joel Molina as Emil
 Jojo Riguerra as Victor

Minor and guest cast
 Karen Reyes as Elisse
 Chienna Filomeno as Maxine 
 Cindy Miranda as Victoria
 Nanette Inventor as Rosemarie
 Dindo Arroyo as Zach
 Jonic Magno as Paul
 Giovanni Baldisseri as Omar
 Nina Ricci Alagao as Betsy
 Eric Tai as Neil
 Juan Miguel Severo as spoken word artist

Special participation
 Ruffa Gutierrez as Loreta Miranda
 Dante Rivero as Don Julian Cortes
 TJ Trinidad as Rodrigo Cortes
 Mercedes Cabral as Mia Bartolome
 Manuel Chua as Joey Bartolome
 Sophia Reola as young Angela/Eva
 Andrez del Rosario as young Inno
 Nezzar Piti-Ilan as young Oli

Production

Tentative title
The series was first announced in November 2017, with a tentative title, Nostalgia. On August 8, 2018, the drama was released on full trailer the title was changed to Ngayon at Kailanman.

Reception

Broadcast
Ngayon at Kailanman premiered on August 20, 2018.''

Reruns
The show began airing re-runs since September 14, 2022 to January 1, 2023 on ALLTV.

International

Awards and nominations

See also
List of programs broadcast by ABS-CBN
List of programs broadcast by Jeepney TV
List of ABS-CBN drama series

References

External links
 

ABS-CBN drama series
Philippine romance television series
2018 Philippine television series debuts
2019 Philippine television series endings
Television series by Star Creatives
Filipino-language television shows
Television shows filmed in the Philippines